The 1973 Astor Cup – Singles was an event of the 1974 Astor Cup men's tennis tournament that was played  in Bologna in Italy from 11 February until 17 February 1974. Rod Laver was the defending champion, but lost in the quarterfinals. Third-seeded Arthur Ashe won the singles title, defeating Mark Cox in the final, 6–4, 7–5.

Seeds

Draw

Finals

Top half

Bottom half

References

External links
 ITF tournament edition details

Astor Cup
Astor Cup